Sa'dun Hammadi (22 June 1930 – 14 March 2007) was an Iraqi politician. He was briefly Prime Minister of Iraq under President Saddam Hussein from March until September 1991. He succeeded Hussein, who had previously been prime minister in addition to being president, but was forced out due to his reformist views.

Hammadi was born in Karbala and was a Shi'ite. He joined the Ba'ath Party during the 1940s. In addition, he earned a Ph.D. in economics from the University of Wisconsin–Madison in 1956.

Hammadi previously served a stint as Iraqi Oil Minister, an important portfolio during a time of burgeoning economic progress, and served as Foreign Minister from 1974 until 1983, surviving Saddam's takeover in 1979. He also served as the Speaker of the National Assembly of Iraq from 1983 until 1990 and from 1996 until the Fall of Baghdad in 2003.

During the 1991 Iraq rebellion Hammadi, a Shi'ite in the very top circle of the party, was appointed Prime Minister, likely due to placate Shi'ite Iraqi concerns over political dominance by a Sunni Arab clique from Tikrit. He was subsequently forced out the same year, but was returned to his position as Speaker in 1996.

Hammadi was later imprisoned at a prison camp in Iraq after the invasion. In February 2004, after nine months in the custody of the Americans, he was released and subsequently resettled in Qatar while seeking medical treatment abroad.

He died in a German hospital from liver cancer on 14 March 2007. At his janazah in Doha, his body was wrapped in the Ba'athist Iraqi flag.

References

External links

1930 births
2007 deaths
Deaths from cancer in Germany
Deaths from leukemia
Iraqi emigrants to Qatar
Iraqi Shia Muslims
Members of the Regional Command of the Arab Socialist Ba'ath Party – Iraq Region
Politicians from Karbala
Prime Ministers of Iraq
Speakers of the Council of Representatives of Iraq
University of Wisconsin–Madison College of Letters and Science alumni
Heads of government who were later imprisoned